Sarah Elizabeth Whitin (born April 18, 1836, died Dec 26, 1917) was sole benefactor of the Whitin Observatory, which she had built on the campus of Wellesley College near Boston.

Biography 
She was born Sarah Elizabeth Pratt, daughter of a physician in Hopkinton, Mass. In her childhood, Sarah Elizabeth was fascinated by the stars and on dark nights, would spread out a blanket in the open and, armed with an atlas, would lie in the dark with friends and identify constellations.

On January 20, 1875, when she was almost 39 years old, Sarah became the second wife of the industrialist John Crane Whitin (1807–1882), owner of the Whitin Machine Works in Whitinsville, Massachusetts. John was almost 30 years her senior and died only seven years later. After his passing, Sarah was "left with large means" and traveled extensively.

Trustee 
Sarah Elizabeth Whitin was elected to the Wellesley College Board of Trustees in 1896 and immediately took a keen interest in campus activities, especially the study of astronomy. In 1896, she became engaged in conversation with the college's first professor of physics and astronomy, Sarah Frances Whiting (1847–1927) (they had very similar names but were not related). At the time, the college only had a portable telescope measuring 4 inches, which could be put on a porch roof of College Hall for celestial observations.

At a campus gathering, Professor Whiting mentioned to Mrs. Whitin that there was a 12-inch refracting telescope still in use in the Olmstead Observatory "which had suddenly become available at a bargain price." Professor Whiting had used the telescope when she taught in Brooklyn, N.Y. and encouraged its purchase for use at a new Wellesley observatory.

In response to Professor Whiting's suggestions for a new observatory, Whitin wrote "You need not feel that you have made extravagant suggestions. It is only the carrying out of my own ideas as they become broader... My ideas are now way ahead of the little observatory or of my bank account, else it would be far better than it will be!"

Observatory 
As told in Wellesley College 1875–1975: A Century of Women, the telescope was bought in 1899.In the fall of 1898 [Whitin] proposed to give, and the Trustees voted to accept with gratitude, "a [12-inch] telescope and a simple building to house the instrument." Then at a Trustees meeting the following May, "Mrs. Whitin stated that she now proposes to construct the Observatory of white marble in place of brick." When it was formally opened on October 8, 1900, [President] Hazard could report that it housed "a 12" refractor with micrometer, polarizing photometer, and star and sun spectroscopes. A Rowland concave grating spectroscope, of 6' focus, with its accompanying heliostat, is set up in a room capable of being darkened completely. The library is a beautiful room, and the dome by Warner and Swasey is all that it should be."When the observatory opened October 8, 1900, Professor Whiting became its first director and the college received "congratulatory letters from famous women astronomers in Europe." At the time Professor Whiting described it as "the finest student observatory in the country." The benefactor was heavily involved in the design of the facility, including the choice of white marble, and the selection of equipment. She also had strong opinions about the floor covering to be placed in the laboratory saying "it will be good for the girls to put their feet on an India rug."

Additional buildings 
Soon after completion of the observatory, Professor Whiting began exploring plans for an expansion and went back to Mrs. Whitin, as she wrote in the trustee's obituary, which appeared in The Wellesley College News."I knew from the first that it was not large enough for the kind of work we wished to do, and that the nearest college residence hall was too far off for the astronomical staff to be present for the nightly vigil with the stars. Mrs. Whitin herself soon perceived this and of her own initiative began to think of an Observatory House, and an enlargement to the Observatory itself. The beauty and costliness of what was already done seemed difficult to match. Various compromise building materials for the addition were discussed, but after many consultations with the architect, she declared that "marble and copper were good enough," and by 1906 the observatory was doubled with increased equipment, and a house placed beside it, completing a harmonious group, and itself a lovely specimen of domestic architecture."

Timeline 
Whitin Observatory strategic events, according to Wellesley College archives, follow.

Other philanthropic works 
In addition to her efforts at the college, Whitin was a board member, and generous supporter, of the Baldwinsville Hospital for the Feeble Minded, for which she built a large school building, as well as the Hospital for the Insane in Worcester, Massachusetts.

Death 
Sarah Elizabeth Whitin remained an active Wellesley Trustee until her illness the last two years of her life. She died on December 26, 1917. She is buried with her husband (and his first wife) in Pine Grove Cemetery, Whitinsville.

References 

1836 births
1917 deaths
Whitin Observatory
Amateur astronomers
American women astronomers
People associated with astronomy